was a Japanese professional sumo wrestler from Katsushika District, Shimōsa Province.  He was the sport's 14th yokozuna. Nicknamed "Tanikaze of the Meiji era", he's the only officially recognized yokozuna of the "yokozuna abuse era" following the fall of the Tokugawa shogunate.

Early life and career
He was born . At the age of 13, he went to work for a sake wholesaler in Shinkawa, Edo (now located in Chūō, Tokyo). It is said that he was encouraged to join sumo when the owner, who saw Masakichi carrying a large barrel with ease, and who loved sumo, enthusiastically told him to become a wrestler. Masakichi joined the Sakaigawa stable and began his career in November 1857. He reached the top makuuchi division in April 1867. Both shikona were inspired by the name of his previous employer's shop, and by the name of a famous sake brewery. Shihoyama brewery also purchased a new keshō-mawashi set. Despite his small stature, Sakaigawa had a drum belly and a strong body, and rose steadily through the ranks. During his time in the makuuchi ranks, he did not suddenly defeat any opponent, but rather allowed his opponent to wrestle sufficiently before going on to win the match, and his opponents were impressed by his ring attitude even after his defeat. He won the equivalent of his first tournament championship in June 1868 from the maegashira ranks, emerging undefeated with eight wins (though this was before the championship system established in 1909). He was promoted to ōzeki in April 1870 after winning two tournaments in a row from the rank of sekiwake. The Sakaigawa name had previously been used by another wrestler from the same stable, who had been an ōzeki from 1857 to 1861.

Yokozuna
In 1877, the Emperor Meiji was scheduled to hold a tournament at the Shimazu clan's residence in Azabu, Tokyo. In February of the same year, he was invited to a  Sumo tournament in Osaka. However the civil war forced the cancellation of the sumo tournaments. The head of the Yoshida family (the 23rd ) surrendered after fighting against Saigō Takamori's forces, and the Yoshida family was unable to grant a yokozuna license to Sakaigawa. The authority of the Yoshida family fell because of these events, and since the fall of the Tokugawa shogunate, the Gojō family of Osaka has been thriving, producing an incomprehensible  abundance of yokozuna. Sakaigawa was promoted yokozuna during this period of turmoil, and he was the only yokozuna to be officially recognized at the end of that period of "overproduced yokozuna", known as the "yokozuna abuse era" (横綱濫造時代). His record after being licensed as yokozuna was 20 wins, 8 losses, 20 minutes, 3 days off, and 30 days in a row. In the top makuuchi division, he won 118 bouts and lost 23 bouts, recording a winning percentage of 83.7. However, he also recorded 71 draws because he often let his opponent attack first.

Retirement from sumo and death
Sakaigawa retired in January 1881 and became a full time stablemaster at Sakaigawa stable. In 1870, he had married his master's daughter allowing him to inherit both the Sakaigawa name and the stable. He developed drinking problems and died on September 16, 1887.

Top division record 
The actual time the tournaments were held during the year in this period often varied. The spring tournament recorded for 1878 was actually held in December of the previous year.
 

    
    
  
 
    
    
  

    
    
  

    
    
  

    
    
  

    
    
  

    
    
  

    
    
  

    
    
  

    
    
  

    
    
  

       
    
  

    
    
  

    
    
  

    
  

Championships for the best record in a tournament were not recognized or awarded before the 1909 summer tournament and the above unofficial championships are historically conferred. For more information see yūshō.

See also

Glossary of sumo terms
List of past sumo wrestlers
List of yokozuna

References

1841 births
1887 deaths
Japanese sumo wrestlers
Yokozuna
People from Ichikawa, Chiba
Sumo people from Chiba Prefecture
19th-century wrestlers